Bharti Airtel Limited, commonly known as (d/b/a) Airtel, is an Indian multinational telecommunications services company based in New Delhi. It operates in 18 countries across South Asia and Africa, as well as the Channel Islands. Currently, Airtel provides 4G and 4G+ services all over India and 5G service in selected cities. Currently offered services include fixed-line broadband, and voice services depending upon the country of operation. Airtel had also rolled out its VoLTE technology across all Indian telecom circles. It is the second largest mobile network operator in India and the second largest mobile network operator in the world. Airtel was named India's 2nd most valuable brand in the first ever Brandz ranking by Millward Brown and WPP plc.

Airtel is credited with pioneering the business strategy of outsourcing all of its business operations except marketing, sales and finance and building the 'minutes factory' model of low cost and high volumes. The strategy has since been adopted by several operators. Airtel's equipment is provided and maintained by Ericsson, Huawei, and Nokia Networks whereas IT support is provided by Amdocs. The transmission towers are maintained by subsidiaries and joint venture companies of Bharti including Bharti Infratel and Indus Towers in India. Ericsson agreed for the first time to be paid by the minute for installation and maintenance of their equipment rather than being paid upfront, which allowed Airtel to provide low call rates of /minute.

History
In 1984, Sunil Mittal started assembling push-button phones in India, which he earlier used to import from a Singaporean company, Singtel, replacing the old-fashioned, bulky rotary phones that were in use in the country then. Bharti Telecom Limited (BTL) was incorporated and entered into a technical tie-up with Siemens AG of Germany for the manufacture of electronic push-button phones. By the early 1990s, Bharti was making fax machines, cordless phones and other telecom gear. He named his first push-button phone as 'Mitbrau'.

In 1992, he successfully bid for one of the four mobile phone network licenses auctioned in India. One of the conditions for the Delhi cellular licenses was that the bidder have some experience as a telecom operator. So, Mittal clinched a deal with the French telecom group Vivendi. He was one of the first Indian entrepreneurs to identify the mobile telecom business as a major growth area. His plans were finally approved by the Government in 1994 and he launched services in Delhi in 1995, when Bharti Cellular Limited (BCL) was formed to offer cellular services under the brand name AirTel. Within a few years, Bharti became the first telecom company to cross the 2 million mobile subscriber mark. Bharti also brought down the STD/ISD cellular rates in India under the brand name 'India one'.

In 1999, Bharti Enterprises acquired control of JT Holdings, and extended cellular operations to Karnataka and Andhra Pradesh. In 2000, Bharti acquired control of Skycell Communications, in Chennai. In 2001, the company acquired control of Spice Cell in Calcutta. Bharti Enterprises went public in 2002, and the company was listed on Bombay Stock Exchange and National Stock Exchange of India. In 2003, the cellular phone operations were re-branded under the single Airtel brand. In 2004, Bharti acquired control of Hexacom and entered Rajasthan. In 2005, Bharti extended its network to Andaman and Nicobar. This expansion allowed it to offer voice services all across India.

Airtel launched "Hello Tunes", a caller ring back tone service (CRBT), in July 2004 becoming the first operator in India to do so. The Airtel theme song, composed by A.R. Rahman, was the most popular tune in that year.

In May 2008, it emerged that Airtel was exploring the possibility of buying the MTN Group, a South Africa-based telecommunications company with coverage in 21 countries in Africa and the Middle East. The Financial Times reported that Bharti was considering offering 45 billion for a 100% stake in MTN, which would be the largest overseas acquisition ever by an Indian firm. However, both sides emphasize the tentative nature of the talks, while The Economist magazine noted, "If anything, Bharti would be marrying up," as MTN has more subscribers, higher revenues and broader geographic coverage. However, the talks fell apart as MTN Group tried to reverse the negotiations by making Bharti almost a subsidiary of the new company. In May 2009, Bharti Airtel again confirmed that it was in talks with MTN and the companies agreed to discuss the potential transaction exclusively by 31 July 2009. Talks eventually ended without agreement, some sources stating that this was due to opposition from the South African government.

In 2009, Bharti negotiated for its strategic partner Alcatel-Lucent to manage the network infrastructure for the fixed-line business. Later, Bharti Airtel awarded the three-year contract to Alcatel-Lucent for setting up an Internet Protocol access network across the country. This would help consumers access internet at faster-speed and high-quality internet browsing on mobile handsets.

In 2009, Airtel launched its first international mobile network in Sri Lanka. In June 2010, Bharti acquired the African business of Zain Telecom for $10.7 billion making it the largest ever acquisition by an Indian telecom firm. In 2012, Bharti tied up with Wal-Mart, the US retail giant, to start a number of retail stores across India.

On 18 November 2010, Airtel rebranded itself in India in the first phase of a global rebranding strategy. The company unveiled a new logo with 'airtel' written in lower case. Designed by London-based brand agency, The Brand Union, the new logo is the letter 'a' in lowercase, with 'airtel' written in lowercase under the logo. On 23 November 2010, Airtel's Africa operations were rebranded to 'airtel'. Sri Lanka followed on 28 November 2010 and on 20 December 2010, Warid Telecom rebranded to 'airtel' in Bangladesh.

Acquisitions and mergers

MTN Group merger negotiations
In May 2005, it emerged that Airtel was exploring the possibility of buying the MTN Group, a South Africa-based telecommunications company with operations in 21 countries in Africa and the Middle East. The Financial Times reported that Bharti was considering offering US$45 billion for a 100% stake in MTN, which would be the largest overseas acquisition ever by an Indian firm.  However, both sides emphasized the tentative nature of the talks. The Economist magazine noted, "If anything, Bharti would be marrying up", as MTN had more subscribers, higher revenues and broader geographic coverage. However, the talks fell apart as MTN Group tried to reverse the negotiations by making Bharti almost a subsidiary of the new company.

In May 2009, Airtel confirmed that it was again in talks with MTN and both companies agreed to discuss the potential transaction exclusively by 31 July 2009. Airtel said "Bharti Airtel Ltd is pleased to announce that it has renewed its effort for a significant partnership with MTN Group". The exclusivity period was extended twice up to 30 September 2009. Talks eventually ended without agreement.

A solution was proposed where the new company would be listed on two stock exchanges, one in South Africa and one in India. However, dual-listing of companies is not permitted by Indian law.

Acquisition of Zain's Africa operations

In June 2010, Bharti struck a deal to buy Zain's mobile operations in 15 African countries, in India's second-biggest overseas acquisition after Tata Steel's $13 billion buy of Corus in 2007. Bharti Airtel completed its $10.7 billion acquisition of African operations from the Kuwaiti firm on 8 June 2010, making Airtel the world's fifth largest wireless carrier by subscriber base. Airtel has reported that its revenues for the fourth quarter of 2010 grew by 53% to US$3.2 billion compared to the previous year, newly acquired Zain Africa division contributed US$911 million to the total. However, net profits dropped by 41% from US$470 million in 2009 to US$291 million in 2010 due to a US$188 million increase in radio spectrum charges in India and an increase of US$106 million in debt interest.

Warid Bangladesh and Robi

In 2010, Warid Telecom sold a majority 70.90% stake in the company to Bharti Airtel for US$300 million. The Bangladesh Telecommunication Regulatory Commission approved the deal on 4 January 2010. Bharti Airtel Limited took management control of the company and its board, and rebranded the company's services under its own "airtel" brand from 20 December 2010. Warid Telecom sold its remaining 30% share to Bharti Airtel's Singapore-based concern Bharti Airtel Holdings Pte Limited in March 2013.

On 16 November 2016, airtel Bangladesh was merged into Robi as a product brand of Robi, where Robi Axiata Limited is the licensee of airtel brand in Bangladesh. Robi is a joint venture between Malaysian telecom operator Axiata holding 61.82% and Bharti Airtel holding 28.18%.

Telecom Seychelles
On 11 August 2010, Bharti Airtel announced that it would acquire a 100% stake in Telecom Seychelles for US$62 million taking its global presence to 19 countries. Telecom Seychelles began operations in 1998 and operates 3G, fixed-line, ship to shore services, satellite telephony, among value added services like VSAT and Gateways for International Traffic across Seychelles under the Airtel brand. The company has over 57% share of the mobile market of Seychelles. Airtel announced plans to invest US$10 million in its fixed and mobile telecoms network in Seychelles over three years, whilst also participating in the Seychelles East Africa submarine cable (SEAS) project. The US$34 million SEAS project is aimed at improving Seychelles' global connectivity by building a 2,000 km undersea high-speed link to Dar es Salaam in Tanzania.

Wireless Business Services Private Limited
WBSPL was a joint venture founded by Qualcomm and held BWA spectrum in the telecom circles of Delhi, Haryana, Kerala and Mumbai. Qualcomm had spent US$1 billion to acquire BWA spectrum in those 4 circles. The deal gave Airtel a 4G presence in 18 circles. On 4 July 2013, Airtel announced that it had acquired an additional 5% equity share capital (making its stake 51%) in all the four BWA entities of Qualcomm, thereby making them its subsidiaries. On 18 October 2013, Airtel announced that it had acquired 100 percent equity shares of WBSPL for an undisclosed sum, making it a wholly owned subsidiary.

Augere Wireless
Airtel purchased Augere Wireless Broadband India Private Limited, a company that owned 4G spectrum in the Chhattisgarh-Madhya Pradesh circle for an undisclosed sum in December 2015. The Economic Times estimated Augere's spectrum to be worth . On 16 February 2017, Airtel announced that the merger of Augere Wireless into Bharti Airtel Limited had been completed.

Telenor India
On 2 January 2017, The Economic Times reported that Airtel had entered into discussions with Telenor India to acquire the latter. On 23 February 2017, Airtel announced that it had entered into a definitive agreement to acquire Telenor. As part of the deal, Airtel will acquire Telenor India's assets and customers in all seven telecom circles that the latter operates in - Andhra Pradesh, Bihar, Maharashtra, Gujarat, Uttar Pradesh (East), Uttar Pradesh (West) and Assam. Airtel will gain a 43.4 MHz spectrum in the 1800 MHz band from the Telenor acquisition. Business Standard reported that it was a no-cash deal, but would cost Airtel 1,600 crore over a 10-year period due to spectrum license payments.

Tikona 4G spectrum
On 23 March 2017, The Economic Times reported that Airtel had acquired Tikona Digital Networks Pvt. Ltd's 4G spectrum for approximately 1,600 crores. The deal also includes Tikona's 350 cellular sites in 5 circles. Tikona had purchased 20 MHz of 4G spectrum in the 2,300 MHz band in the 2010 auctions in Gujarat, Himachal Pradesh, Uttar Pradesh (East), Uttar Pradesh (West) and Rajasthan for 1,058 crores. Prior to the deal, Airtel did not hold any spectrum in the 2300 MHz band in UP (East), UP (West) and Rajasthan, and held 10 MHz each in Gujarat and Himachal Pradesh. Tikona's co-founder Rajesh Tiwari sent a legal notice to both companies for not providing details regarding the splitting of proceeds among shareholders.

Tigo Rwanda
Bharti Airtel announced on 12 December 2017 that its Rwandan subsidiary had signed an agreement with Millicom to acquire complete control of the latter's Rwandan subsidiary which operates under the brand name of Tigo Rwanda. The deal was estimated to be worth $60–70 million. The company operated as Airtel-Tigo following the merger, until it was rebranded as Airtel Rwanda in January 2020.

Tata Docomo
In October 2017, Bharti Airtel announced that it would acquire the consumer mobile businesses of Tata Teleservices, Tata Docomo and Tata Teleservices Maharashtra Ltd (TTML), in a debt-free cash-free deal. The deal will essentially be free for Airtel which will only incur TTSL's unpaid spectrum payment liability. TTSL will continue to operate its enterprise, fixed -line and broadband businesses and its stake in tower company Viom Networks. The deal received approval from the Competition Commission of India (CCI) in mid-November 2017. On 29 August 2018, Bharti Airtel got its shareholders' approval for the merger proposal with Tata Teleservices. On 17 January 2019, NCLT Delhi gave final approval for merger between Tata Docomo and Airtel. On July 1, 2019, the consumer mobile business of Tata Teleservices has become part of telecom operator Bharti Airtel.

Airtel will absorb the Tata Sons-owned telco's consumer mobile operations in 19 circles across India—17 under Tata Teleservices and two under Tata Teleservices (Maharashtra) Ltd. As part of the proposed agreement, Airtel will also take over a small portion of the unpaid spectrum liability of Tata Teleservices. Bharti Airtel will get an additional 178.5 MHz of spectrum in three bands—1800 MHz, 2100 MHz and 850 MHz—that are widely used for 4G, an area where Airtel is expanding fast to keep pace with Reliance Jio Infocomm.
Airtel will also add about 13 million of Tata Tele's mobile subscribers as of April 2019 to its nearly 322 million users. But most of Tata Tele's mobile users are inactive, as per the regulator.

Aqilliz
In February 2022, Bharti Airtel announced that it has acquired a strategic stake in a blockchain startup Aqilliz via its "Airtel Startup Accelerator Program". Singapore-based Aqilliz is a blockchain-enabled MediaTech startup offering a new age middleware technology for the media marketplace and create a more collaborative digital marketing environment.

Airtel India

Bharti Telecom (BTL) is a holding company of Bharti Airtel with Bharti Enterprises and Singtel owning 50.56 percent and 49.44 percent, respectively, in BTL, which in turn owns 35.80 percent of Bharti Airtel.

Airtel India is the second largest provider of mobile telephony after Jio and the second largest provider of fixed telephony in India and is also a provider of broadband and subscription television services. It offers its telecom services under the Airtel brand, and is headed by Sunil Bharti Mittal.

Broadband
Airtel provides broadband internet access through DSL, internet leased lines and MPLS (multiprotocol label switching) solutions, as well as IPTV and fixed line telephone services. Until 18 September 2004, Bharti provided fixed line telephony and broadband services under the Touchtel brand. Bharti now provides all telecom services including fixed line services under the common brand Airtel. As of June 2019, Airtel provides Telemedia services; in 99 cities. As on 30 June 2019, Airtel had 2.342 million broadband subscribers.

Airtel Broadband provides broadband and IPTV services. Airtel provides both capped as well as unlimited download plans. However, Airtel's unlimited plans are subject to free usage policy (FUP), which reduces speed after the customer crosses a certain data usage limit. In most of the plans, Airtel provides only 64KByte/second beyond FUP which is equal to other competitors' tariffs. The maximum speed available for home users under the new V-Fiber program is up to 300Mbit/s and with DSL is 16Mbit/s.

In May 2012, Airtel Broadband and some other Indian ISPs temporarily blocked file sharing websites such as vimeo.com, megavideo.com, and thepiratebay.se, without giving any legal information to customers.

In June 2011, The Economic Times reported that the Telemedia business was merged with Mobile and DTH businesses.

Digital television

The digital television business provides Direct-to-Home (DTH) TV services across India under the brand name Airtel digital TV. It started services on 9 October 2008 and had about 16.027 million customers at the end of June 2019.

Banking

Airtel Payments Bank was launched in January 2017.

Business 
Airtel Business consists largely of six products: cloud and managed services, digital signage, NLD/ILD connectivity (VSAT / MPLS / IPLC and Ethernet products), Wi-Fi dongles, voice solutions (like toll-free numbers, TracMate, and automated media reading) and conferencing solutions (VoIP, audio, video, and web conferencing), serving industry verticals like BFSI, IT/ITeS, manufacturing, hospitality and government.

Airtel Business, the B2B arm of Bharti Airtel, has rolled out a first of its kind dedicated digital platform to serve the growing connectivity, communication and collaboration requirements of emerging businesses, including SMEs and startups. The digital platform will offer solutions to emerging enterprises to enable ease of business and faster time to market.

Android-based tablet
Beetel Teletech Ltd., a unit of Bharti Enterprises Ltd., on 18 August 2011, launched a  7-inch tablet in India based on Google Inc.'s Android operating system. The offering is intended to capitalise on the expected demand for cheap computing devices in the world's fastest-growing and second-largest mobile phone market.

International presence

Airtel is the third- largest mobile operator in the world by subscriber base and has a commercial presence in 17 countries and the Channel Islands.

Its area of operations include:
 The Indian Subcontinent:
 Airtel India, in India
 Airtel Sri Lanka, in Sri Lanka
 Robi, in Bangladesh
 Airtel Africa, which operates in 14 African countries:
 Chad, Democratic Republic of the Congo, Congo, Gabon, Kenya, Madagascar, Malawi, Niger, Nigeria, Rwanda, Seychelles, Tanzania, Uganda and Zambia.
 The British Crown Dependencies of Jersey and Guernsey, under the brand name Airtel-Vodafone, through a joint venture with Vodafone.

Airtel operates in the following countries:

†Jersey and Guernsey are British Crown Dependencies. They are not independent countries. Therefore, Airtel's countries of operation are considered to be 17.

Africa

Airtel Africa is a subsidiary of Bharti Airtel, which provides telecommunications and mobile money services in 14 countries in Africa, primarily in East, Central, and West Africa. Airtel Nigeria is the most profitable unit of Airtel Africa, due to its cheap data plans in Nigeria. As of March 2019, Airtel had over 99 million subscribers on the continent. It is listed on the London Stock Exchange and is a constituent of the FTSE 250 Index.

On 8 June 2010, Bharti Airtel completed the purchase of mobile operations in 15 African countries from Zain, a Kuwaiti operator.

On 11 August 2010, Bharti Airtel announced that it would acquire Telecom Seychelles for US$62 million.

On 15 August 2017, Bharti Airtel and Millicom's Tigo in Ghana merged to form new company AirtelTigo. On 27 October 2020, Airtel announced that it planned to exit its business in Ghana, and that it had entered into "advanced stages of discussions" for sale of shares in AirtelTigo to the Government of Ghana.

Sale to Orange
On 13 January 2016, France-based Orange SA and Bharti Airtel inked a deal to sell Airtel's operations in Burkina Faso and Sierra Leone to Orange. On 19 July 2016, Airtel completed the deal.

Bangladesh
airtel Bangladesh Ltd. was a GSM-based cellular operator in Bangladesh. Airtel was the sixth mobile phone carrier to enter the Bangladesh market, and originally launched commercial operations under the brand name "Warid Telecom" on 10 May 2007. Warid Telecom International LLC, an Abu Dhabi–based consortium, sold a majority 70% stake in the company to India's Bharti Airtel Limited for US$300 million.

On 16 November 2016, airtel Bangladesh was merged into Robi as a product brand of Robi Axiata, where Robi Axiata Limited is the licensee of the Airtel brand in Bangladesh. Robi at present is a joint venture between Axiata Group of Malaysia, Bharti Airtel of India and NTT Docomo Inc. of Japan. Axiata holds 68.7% controlling stake in the entity, Bharti holds 25% while the remaining 6.3% is held by NTT Docomo of Japan.

Sri Lanka

Bharti Airtel Lanka (Pvt) Ltd is a subsidiary of Bharti Airtel Limited. Bharti Airtel has been featured in Forbes Asia's Fab 50 list, rated amongst the best-performing companies in the world in the BusinessWeek IT 100 list 2007, and voted as India's most innovative company in a survey by The Wall Street Journal.

Airtel Lanka commenced commercial operations of services on 13 January 2009. Granted a license in 2007 in accordance with the Sri Lanka Telecommunications Act No. 25 of 1991, it is also a registered company under the Board of Investment of Sri Lanka. Under the license, the company provides digital mobile services to Sri Lanka. This is inclusive of voice telephony, voicemail, data services and GSM-based services. All of these services are provided under the Airtel brand.

Channel Islands: Jersey and Guernsey

On 1 May 2007, Jersey Airtel and Guernsey Airtel, both wholly-owned subsidiaries of the Bharti Group, announced they would launch mobile services in the British Crown Dependency islands of Jersey and Guernsey under the brand name Airtel-Vodafone after signing an agreement with Vodafone. Airtel-Vodafone operates a 4G network in Jersey and Guernsey.

Subscriber base
Bharti Airtel has about 303.08 million subscribers worldwide—264.58 million in India and South Asia and 50.949 million in Africa as of December 2011. The numbers include mobile services subscribers in 19 countries and Indian Telemedia services and Digital services subscribers.

One Network
One Network is a mobile phone network that allows Airtel customers to use the service in a number of countries at the same price as their home network. Customers can place outgoing calls at the same rate as their local network, and incoming calls are free. , the service is available in Bangladesh, Burkina Faso, Chad, Democratic Republic of Congo, Congo Brazzaville, Gabon, Ghana, India, Kenya, Madagascar, Niger, Nigeria, Rwanda, Seychelles, Sierra Leone, Sri Lanka, Tanzania, Uganda, and Zambia only for international roamers from Airtel Africa

Joint ventures and agreements

Airtel-Vodafone

On 1 May 2007, Jersey Airtel and Guernsey Airtel, both wholly-owned subsidiaries of the Bharti Group, announced they would launch mobile services in the British Crown Dependency islands of Jersey and Guernsey under the brand name Airtel-Vodafone after signing an agreement with Vodafone. Airtel-Vodafone operates a 4G network in Jersey and Guernsey.

Airtel-Ericsson
In July 2011, Bharti signed a five-year agreement with Ericsson, who will manage and optimize Airtel's mobile networks in Africa. Ericsson will modernize and upgrade Airtel's mobile networks in Africa with the latest technology including its multi-standard RBS 6000 base station. As part of the modernization, Ericsson will also provide technology consulting, network planning & design and network deployment. Ericsson has been the managed services and network technology partner in  Asian operations.

Sponsorship

On 9 May 2009, Airtel signed a major deal with Manchester United. As a result of the deal, Airtel had the rights to broadcast the matches played by the team to its customers.

Bharti Airtel signed a five-year deal with ESPN Star Sports to become the title sponsor of the Champions League Twenty20 cricket tournament.

Airtel also signed a deal to be the title sponsor of the Formula One Indian Grand Prix.

Airtel sponsored the 2018–21 FIA GT World Cup.

Airtel signed a deal to be the title sponsor of the I-League for 2013–14 I-League.

Airtel is also the main sponsor of Airtel Super Singer and Airtel Super Singer Junior since 2006, which are currently broadcast on Vijay TV.

Signature tune

The signature tune of Airtel is composed by Indian musician A. R. Rahman. The tune became hugely popular and is the world's most downloaded mobile music, with over 150 million downloads. Rahman along with Anu Malik re-used the same tune in a 2004 Kannada movie Love. A new version of the song was released on 18 November 2010, as part of the rebranding of the company. This version was also composed by Rahman.

Controversies

Net neutrality debate

In February 2014, Gopal Vittal, CEO of Airtel's India operations, said that companies offering free messaging apps like Skype, Line and WhatsApp should be regulated similar to telecom operators. In August 2014, TRAI rejected a proposal from telecom companies to make messaging application firms share part of their revenue with the carriers or the government. In November 2014, TRAI began investigating if Airtel was implementing preferential access by offering special internet packs which allowed WhatsApp and Facebook data at rates that were lower than its standard data rates. The statements of Chua Sock Koong, Group CEO of Singtel and also a shareholder (32.15%) of Bharti Airtel share similar statements about the Anti-Net Neutrality position.

In December 2014, Airtel changed its service terms for 2G and 3G data packs so that VoIP data was excluded from the set amount of free data. The TRAI chief Rahul Khullar said that Airtel cannot be held responsible for violating net neutrality because India has no regulation that demands net neutrality. Airtel's move faced criticism on social networking sites like Facebook, Twitter and Reddit. Later on 29 December 2014, Airtel announced that it would not be implementing the planned changes, pointing out that there were reports that TRAI would be soon releasing a consultation paper on the issue.

In April 2015, Airtel announced the "Airtel Zero" scheme. Under the scheme, app firms will sign a contract and Airtel will provide the apps for free to its customers. The reports of Flipkart, an e-commerce firm, joining the "Airtel Zero" scheme drew negative response. People began to give the one-star rating to its app on Google Play. Following the protest, Flipkart decided to pull out of Airtel Zero. The e-commerce giant confirmed the news in an official statement, saying, "We will be walking away from the ongoing discussions with Airtel for their platform Airtel Zero."

User privacy
In June 2015, a code used by the company was accused of compromising subscribers' privacy.

eKYC licence suspension
The Unique Identification Authority of India (UIDAI) suspended Bharti Airtel and Airtel Payments Bank Limited's licence for eKYC of Aadhar on 16 December 2017, following complaints from customers that their accounts were being opened without their consent. Some even received their LPG subsidies in their Airtel Payments Bank accounts.

Airtel app security flaw
On 8 December 2019, a serious security fault was detected that existed in Airtel's API. The bug allowed potential threat actors to "fetch sensitive user information of any Airtel subscriber." Shiraz Ahmed was the first to observe this security vulnerability, and he released a video demonstrating a script being used to obtain information from the Airtel's mobile app's API. On his blog, Ehraz concluded that such flaw can result in "revealed information like first and last name, gender, email, date of birth, address, subscription information, device capability information for 4G, 3G & GPRS, network information, activation date, user type (prepaid or postpaid) and current IMEI number", all being very sensitive user information.

Airtel acknowledged the issue and it was fixed shortly after, it is yet to confirm whether there was an actual data breach or not.

See also 

 Airtel Africa
 Airtel Bangladesh
 Airtel India
 Airtel Sri Lanka
 Airtel-Vodafone
 Bharti Enterprises
 SingTel
 List of mobile network operators
 List of telecom companies in India

References

External links

 

 
Telecommunications companies of India
Internet service providers of India
Mobile phone companies of India
Multinational companies headquartered in India
Mass media companies based in Delhi
Companies based in New Delhi
Indian companies established in 1995
Telecommunications companies established in 1995
Private equity portfolio companies
BSE SENSEX
NIFTY 50
Vodafone
Indian brands
Telecommunications in Africa
Warburg Pincus companies
1995 establishments in Delhi
Companies listed on the National Stock Exchange of India
Companies listed on the Bombay Stock Exchange
Telecommunications in Nigeria